Lake Porkuni is a lake in Porkuni, in northern Estonia. It's the source of the Valgejõgi River.

See also
Battle of Porkuni (1944)

Porkuni
Tapa Parish
Landforms of Lääne-Viru County
Tourist attractions in Lääne-Viru County